Juan Martín del Potro defeated the defending champion Roger Federer in the final, 6–4, 6–7(8–10), 7–6(7–2) to win the men's singles tennis title at the 2018 Indian Wells Masters. He saved three championship points en route to his maiden ATP Tour Masters 1000 title, following three previous runner-up finishes.

Federer and Rafael Nadal (despite having withdrawn from the event) were in contention for the ATP No. 1 singles ranking. Federer retained the top ranking by reaching the semifinals.

Seeds
All seeds receive a bye into the second round.

Draw

Finals

Top half

Section 1

Section 2

Section 3

Section 4

Bottom half

Section 5

Section 6

Section 7

Section 8

Qualifying

Seeds

Qualifiers

Lucky losers

Qualifying draw

First qualifier

Second qualifier

Third qualifier

Fourth qualifier

Fifth qualifier

Sixth qualifier

Seventh qualifier

Eighth qualifier

Ninth qualifier

Tenth qualifier

Eleventh qualifier

Twelfth qualifier

References

External links
Main Draw
Qualifying Draw

Men's Singles